Eilema proleuca is a moth of the subfamily Arctiinae. It was described by George Hampson in 1914. It is found in Ghana.

References

 

Endemic fauna of Ghana
proleuca
Moths described in 1914